Ilex brachyphylla is a type of holly - a  species of plant in the family Aquifoliaceae. It has leathery glossy green leaves which have serrated edges and a sharp point. Although male flowers have been described, the Flora of China records that female flowers have not been observed and neither has the fruit. It is rare and an endangered species found only on mountain slopes in south-west Hunan province.

References

Endemic flora of China
brachyphylla
Endangered plants
Taxonomy articles created by Polbot